Russia Corners Historic District is a national historic district located at the hamlet of  Russia in Herkimer County, New York. The district includes six contributing buildings.  They are the Russia Union Church (1820), Russia District School No. 5 (1816; modified in late 1880s), and four residences built between about 1803 and 1830.

It was listed on the National Register of Historic Places in 1996.

Gallery

References

Historic districts on the National Register of Historic Places in New York (state)
Historic districts in Herkimer County, New York
National Register of Historic Places in Herkimer County, New York